Adagil is a village in Jalandhar. Jalandhar is a district in the Indian state of Punjab.

About 
Adagil lies on the Jalandhar-Kapurthala road.  The nearest railway station to Adagil is Jalandhar Railway station at 14 km from it.

Post code 

Adagil's Post office is Athola whose PIN code is 144002.

References 

 A Punjabi website with Adagil's details

Villages in Jalandhar district